Eastern Caribbean Financial Holding Company is a Saint Lucian financial services holding company listed on the Eastern Caribbean Securities Exchange.

Subsidiaries 
 Bank of Saint Lucia
 EC Global Insurance (20%)
 Bank of Saint Vincent and the Grenadines (51%)

References

External links 
 Official site
 Bloomberg profile

Companies of Saint Lucia